Gakuen-mae Station (Tezukayama Gakuen-mae)(学園前駅 (帝塚山学園前)) is a railway station on Kintetsu Railway's Nara Line in Nara, Japan.

Lines
Kintetsu Railway
Nara Line (A20)

Building
The station has 2 side platforms and 2 tracks.

History
 March 6, 1942 - The station began operating as a station of Kansai Kyuko Electric Railway
 June 1, 1944 - Kankyu merged, and the station becomes part of Kinki Nippon Railway
 September, 1999 - Station renovations are done
 April 1, 2007 - Starts using PiTaPa

Adjacent stations

Railway stations in Japan opened in 1942
Railway stations in Nara Prefecture
Buildings and structures in Nara, Nara